The list of ship commissionings in 2019 includes a chronological list of all ships commissioned in 2019.


See also

References

2019
 
Ships